Prosíčka is a municipality and village in Havlíčkův Brod District in the Vysočina Region of the Czech Republic. It has about 100 inhabitants.

Administrative parts
The municipality is made up of village parts of Dolní Prosíčka and Horní Prosíčka, and the village of Nezdín.

References

Villages in Havlíčkův Brod District